Serhiy Serhiyovych Bolbat (born 13 June 1993) is a Ukrainian professional footballer who plays as a midfielder for Kolos Kovalivka.

Career
Bolbat is the product of the youth systems of Shakhtar Donetsk. He was called up for the Ukrainian Youth Football team.

Lokeren
For the 2015–16 Belgian Pro League season, he signed for Lokeren.

Loan to Mariupol
In summer 2017 he moved on loan to FC Mariupol in Ukrainian Premier League, where he played 26 matches and scored 5 goals.

Shakhtar Donetsk
He won the 2018–19 Ukrainian Premier League and 2019-20 Ukrainian Premier League with Shakhtar Donetsk, as the 2018–19 Ukrainian Cup.

Loan to Desna Chernihiv
In August 2021 he moved on loan to Desna Chernihiv in the Ukrainian Premier League. On 22 August he made his league debut against Dynamo Kyiv at the Valeriy Lobanovskyi Dynamo Stadium, replacing Levan Arveladze in the 46th minute.

Kolos Kovalivka
On 1 July 2022 he moved to Kolos Kovalivka.

International career
In 2014 he made his senior debut for Ukraine, earning additional caps in 2018 and 2019.

Career statistics

Club

International

Honours
Shakhtar Donetsk

Ukrainian Premier League 
Winner (2): 2018–19, 2019–20

Ukrainian Cup 
Winner (1): 2018–19

 Ukrainian Super Cup 
Winner (1): 2014

Gallery

References

External links
 Profile on Official FC Desna Chernihiv website
 
 

1993 births
Living people
People from Volnovakha
Ukrainian footballers
FC Shakhtar Donetsk players
FC Shakhtar-3 Donetsk players
FC Metalurh Donetsk players
FC Metalist Kharkiv players
Ukrainian Premier League players
Ukrainian Second League players
Ukraine international footballers
K.S.C. Lokeren Oost-Vlaanderen players
FC Mariupol players
FC Desna Chernihiv players
FC Kolos Kovalivka players
Belgian Pro League players
Ukrainian expatriate footballers
Expatriate footballers in Belgium
Ukrainian expatriate sportspeople in Belgium
Association football midfielders
Sportspeople from Donetsk Oblast